Skill India or the National Skills Development Mission of India is a campaign launched by Prime Minister Narendra Modi. It is managed by the National Skills Development Corporation of India.

History
Skill India campaign was launched by Prime Minister Narendra Modi on 15 July 2015 to train over 30 crore people in India in different skills by 2022.

Initiatives
Various initiatives under this campaign are:
 National Skill Development Mission
 National Policy for Skill Development and Entrepreneurship, 2015
 Pradhan Mantri Kaushal Vikas Yojana (PMKVY)
 Skill Loan scheme
 Rural India Skill

Partnership concept
UK has entered into a partnership with India under skill India programme. Virtual partnerships will be initiated at the school level to enable young people of these country to experience the school system of the other country and develop an understanding of the culture, traditions and social and family systems. A commitment to achieve mutual recognition of UK and Indian qualifications was made.

Skill India Developments

Apr 16, 2022: India’s first Skill India International Centre will be set up in Bhubaneswar for training youths with an aim to enhance overseas opportunities for the skilled workforce. A memorandum of understanding was exchanged between the National Skill Development Corporation (NSDC) and the Skill Development Institute (SDI) on Saturday in presence of Union Skill Development and Entrepreneurship Minister Dharmendra Pradhan.

The recent systematic literature review conducted by Cabral and Dhar (2019) has identified the significance of skill development wherein the implementation of such schemes mitigate poverty, utilize demographic dividend, socio-economic empowerment of under privileged sectors, achieve economic growth, reduce social challenges, and economic inclusion. As far as institutional mechanism is concerned, the National Skill Development Corporation (NSDC), Ministry of Skill Development and Entrepreneurship and the scheme - Prime Minister Kaushal Vikas Yojana (PMKVY) have resulted to achieve considerable results, but not achieved the expected outcomes. The study argues the essential requirement of skill development to achieve technology adoption and women empowerment in the country.

Oracle on 12 February 2016 announced that it will build a new 2.8 million sq. ft. campus in Bengaluru will be Oracle's largest outside of its headquarters in Redwood Shores, California. Oracle Academy will launch an initiative to train more than half-a-million students each year to develop computer science skills by expanding its partnerships to 2,700 institutions in India from 1,800 at present.

Japan's private sector is to set up six institutes of manufacturing to train 30,000 people over ten years in Japanese-style manufacturing skills and practices, primarily in the rural areas. Japan-India Institute of Manufacturing (JIM) and Japanese Endowed Courses (JEC) in engineering colleges designated by Japanese companies in India in cooperation between the public and private sectors would be established for this purpose. The first three institutes would be set up in Gujarat, Karnataka and Rajasthan in the summer of 2017.

In the budget of fiscal year 2017 - 18 the government of India has decided to set aside ₹ 17,000 crore, the highest ever allocation to this sector, in order to boost the Skill India Mission. At least ten million Indian youth enter the country’s workforce each year, but the employment creation in India has not been able to absorb this influx, making increasing unemployment a severe problem. Through this allocation the government aims at generating employment and providing livelihood to the millions of young Indians who enter the work force every year.

The government has invested ₹ 4000 crore in the launch of SANKALP (Skill Acquisition and Knowledge Awareness for Livelihood Promotion Programme), another big initiative under the Skill India Mission. Through this it aims at providing market relevant training to 350 million young Indians. Apart from this, the government would set up 100 India International Skills Centres that will conduct advanced courses in foreign languages to help youngsters prepare for overseas jobs.
It provides opportunities to the youth of India.

Skill development for women 
According to  CSO, 59.30% rural women are self-employed and male ratio is 54.50%. This clearly indicates that the government has been undertaking proactive steps to converge the entrepreneurship in India towards development of rural women.  Through the 2nd phase of Pradhan Mantri Kaushal Vikas Yojana, around 68.12 lakhs of women had undergone skill training. And also, around 4.08 lakh women had undergone training during 2018-2020, and Industrial training Institutes (ITI) had completed training for 38.72 lakhs women.

Performance
As of 15 February 2016, the "Indian Leather Development Programme" trained 51,216 youth in a span of 100 days and it plans to train 1,44,000 young persons annually. Four new branches of "Footwear Design & Development Institute" — at Hyderabad, Patna, Banur (Punjab) and Ankleshwar (Gujarat) — are being set up to improve training infrastructure. The industry is undergoing acute skill shortage and most of the people trained are being absorbed by the industry.

In an endeavour to prepare a generation of skilled employees and leaders in alignment with the modern day market demands, Skill India was launched by Prime Minister Narendra Modi in 2015 Skill India, launched to train over 40 crore citizens with different industry relevant skills by 2022, is to be implemented through a streamlined institutional.

References

External links
 Skill India 
 Ministry of Skill Development And Entrepreneurship
 Ministry of Skill Development And Entrepreneurship
 National Skill Development Agency
Future Of Skill Based Training And Development In India
 SkillingIndia, an IIT IIM Alumni Initiative

2015 establishments in India
Ministry of Skill Development and Entrepreneurship